Felicia Wiedermann (born 28 January 2002) is a German field hockey player.

Career

Club level
In club competition, Wiedermann plays for Club an der Alster in the German Bundesliga.

National teams

Under–18
Felicia Wiedermann made her international debut for Germany at U–18 level. She represented the team at the 2021 edition of the EuroHockey Youth Championship in Valencia.

Under–21
In 2022, Wiedermann was named in the German U–21 squad for the FIH Junior World Cup in Potchefstroom.

Die Danas
Wiedermann made her senior debut for Die Danas in 2022. Her first appearance was during season three of the FIH Pro League, in Germany's away matches against India. In the second match, she scored her first international goal.

International goals

References

External links
 
 

2002 births
Living people
German female field hockey players
Female field hockey midfielders
21st-century German women
Der Club an der Alster players